The men's field hockey tournament at the 2014 Asian Games for men was held in Incheon, South Korea, from 20 September to 2 October 2014.

Qualification

Squads

Preliminary round
All times are Korea Standard Time (UTC+09:00)

Pool A

Pool B

Classification round

Fifth to tenth place classification

Ninth and tenth place

Seventh and eighth place

Fifth and sixth place

Medal round

Semi-finals

Bronze medal match

Gold medal match

Final standings

 Qualified for the 2016 Summer Olympics

References

Results

External links
Official website

Men
Asian Games
2014